The Moroccan Royal Badminton Federation is the governing body for badminton in Morocco.

Created in 1992, the F.R.M.BA is a member of the W.B.F / B.C.A. since 1993. Omar Bellali is the president.

References 

Sports governing bodies in Morocco
Badminton in Morocco
Sports organizations established in 1992